Pippa may refer to:

 Pippa (given name)
 Pippa Bacca (1974-2008), performance artist 
 Kelly Ripa (born 1970), nicknamed Pippa, American talk show host

Fictional characters
 Pippa Cross, a character in books by Libba Bray
 Pippa Ross, a character in Australian soap opera Home and Away
 Pippa Saunders, a character in the show Home and Away
 Pippa, a character in Dead Set (TV series)
 Pippa, the protagonist of The Private Lives of Pippa Lee, a 2009 film
 Pippa Fitz-Amobi, the protagonist of the A Good Girl's Guide to Murder book series
 Pippa, a character in The Goldfinch,
 The 2013 novel by Donna Tartt
 The 2019 film based on the novel

Other uses
 Pippa (doll), a British toy doll
 648 Pippa, a minor planet orbiting the Sun

See also
 Pipa (disambiguation)